Nelkas Kwemo (born May 5, 1995) is a professional Canadian football linebacker who is a free agent. He was most recently a member of the Toronto Argonauts of the Canadian Football League (CFL). He played U Sports football with the Queen's Gaels from 2014 to 2017.

Professional career
Kwemo was drafted 18th overall in the 2018 CFL Draft by the Toronto Argonauts after he was ranked as the 17th best prospect in the December 2017 Scouting Bureau Rankings, but un-ranked in the Final April report. He signed with the team on May 19, 2018. Kwemo was injured to begin the 2018 season, but made his debut on August 18, 2018. He played in 11 regular season games, recording three defensive tackles and 15 special teams tackles, earning praise on special teams alongside fellow 2018 draft pick and core special teamer Sean Harrington. The Argonauts' 2019 was just as disappointing as 2018 with a 4-14 record, but Kwemo developed into a rotational linebacker with 13 tackles on defense, and he continued his special teams excellence with 16 more tackles.

Kwemo signed a contract extension with the Argonauts on December 28, 2020. He was placed on the suspended list on July 10, 2021. He sat out the entire season and became a free agent upon the expiry of his contract on February 8, 2022.

Personal life
Kwemo was born in Paris, France, but moved to Montreal, Quebec at an early age.

References

External links
Toronto Argonauts bio

1995 births
Living people
Canadian football linebackers
French players of Canadian football
French emigrants to Canada
Queen's Golden Gaels football players
Sportspeople from Paris
Toronto Argonauts players